Lambertus "Ben" Gerhardus Kniest (27 August 1927 – 18 July 1992) was a water polo player from the Netherlands, who competed at the 1960 and 1964 Summer Olympics; in both games he finished in eighth position with the Dutch team.

See also
 Netherlands men's Olympic water polo team records and statistics
 List of men's Olympic water polo tournament goalkeepers

References

External links
 

1927 births
1992 deaths
Sportspeople from Arnhem
Dutch male water polo players
Water polo goalkeepers
Olympic water polo players of the Netherlands
Water polo players at the 1960 Summer Olympics
Water polo players at the 1964 Summer Olympics
20th-century Dutch people